Cyprian (c. 200–258) was bishop of Carthage and a notable Early Christian writer and saint.

Cyprian may also refer to:
the Cyprian, Aphrodite, a goddess in Greek mythology
Cyprian, Metropolitan of Kiev
Cyprian and Justina, Christian saints
Cyprian of Toulon, saint
Cyprian (Bishop of Wrocław)

Churches
St Cyprian's Cathedral, Kimberley, an Anglican cathedral in South Africa
St Cyprian's, Clarence Gate, an Anglican church in London
St Cyprian's Church, Sneinton, an Anglican church in Nottingham
St Cyprian's Church, Hay Mills, an Anglican church in Birmingham
St Cyprian's Church, Lenzie
St. Cyprian's African Methodist Episcopal Church in San Francisco, California
Church of St. Cyprian, Frecheville, an Anglican church in Sheffield

Schools
St Cyprian's School, Cape Town, a school in South Africa
St Cyprian's Grammar School, Kimberley, a school in South Africa
St Cyprian's School, a school in England

People with the given name
Cyprian Michael Iwene Tansi
King Cyprian of the Zulu Kingdom

See also
 Ciprian, a given name
 Cyprianus Gallus, poet
 Cypriot (disambiguation)
 Saint-Cyprien (disambiguation), various places